David Semyonovich Abamelik (1774–1833) was a Russian-Armenian principal, general-major (1818) from the noble Abamelik family. He participated to the wars against Napoleon I (1805–1807 and 1812). Abamelik was awarded the  Order of St. Anna with brilliants.

Sources
Armenian Concise Encyclopedia, Ed. by acad. K. Khudaverdian, Yerevan, 1990, Vol. 1, p. 8
 Armenian Soldiers in the Russian (Prerevolutionary) and Soviet Army

Armenian people from the Russian Empire
Heads of schools in Russia
Nobility from the Russian Empire
1774 births
1833 deaths
David Semyonovich
Educators from the Russian Empire